The Comp Air 8 is an American kit turboprop-powered light civil utility aircraft that was manufactured by Comp Air of Florida from about 2000 until 2021.

The aircraft's webpage was removed in 2021 and the new company website does not list it as being in production in 2022.

Design and development
The aircraft is a Comp Air 7 with its fuselage stretched by 2 feet (0.6 m) to accommodate six adults and two children. The Comp Air 8 is configured as a conventional high-wing monoplane with optional tailwheel or tricycle undercarriage. It can be fitted with large floats for water operations.

The Comp Air 8 fuselage and tail are constructed with carbon fiber. The standard engine used is the Walter M 601D of 

Kit production seems to have ended in 2021.

Operational history
In August 2022 there were seven Comp Air 8s registered in the United States with the Federal Aviation Administration.

Specifications (Comp Air 8)

References

External links

Official website archive on Archive.org

8
Homebuilt aircraft
1990s United States civil utility aircraft
High-wing aircraft
Single-engined tractor aircraft
Single-engined turboprop aircraft